Saam Farahmand (born 1979 in London) is an Iranian-British film and music video director. A fine arts graduate of Goldsmiths, Farahmand is considered, according to The Guardian, "one of the most talented music video directors of his generation.

Biography
Saam Farahmand was Born in 1979 to Iranian parents in Finchley, London, United Kingdom.

Videography
Music videos
Electric Six – "Gay Bar" (2003)
Klaxons – "Gravity's Rainbow", "Magick", & "Golden Skans" (2006)
Klaxons – "Gravity's Rainbow" (new version) & "It's Not Over Yet" (2007)
Hercules and Love Affair – "Blind" (2008)
Janet Jackson – "Feedback" & "Rock with U" (2008)
Late of the Pier – "The Bears Are Coming" (2008)
These New Puritans – "Elvis" (2008)
Cheryl Cole ft. will.i.am – "3 Words" version 2 (2009)
Simian Mobile Disco – "Cruel Intentions" (2009)
The xx – "Islands" (2009)
Klaxons – "Twin Flames" & "Echoes" (2010)
Mark Ronson & The Business Intl. – "Somebody to Love Me" (2010)
Soulwax – "Machine" The film was previsualised, edited and post produced by Andrew Daffy's The House of Curves in London.(2012)
Tom Vek – "Aroused" (2011)
Viktoria Modesta – "Prototype" (2014)
The Last Shadow Puppets – "Everything You've Come to Expect" (2016)
The Last Shadow Puppets – "Aviation" (2016)
The Last Shadow Puppets – "Miracle Aligner" (2016)
Mick Jagger - "Gotta Get A Grip" (2017) 
Ashnikko - You Make Me Sick (2023)
Rockumentaries
Part of the Weekend Never Dies (2008)

See also
Rogue Films

References

External links

Year of birth missing (living people)
Living people
British film directors
British music video directors